Owrazan (also Romanized as Owrāzān, Āvrāzān, and Ūrāzān; also known as Deh-e Avrāzān and Durasān) is a village in Bala Taleqan Rural District, in the Central District of Taleqan County, Alborz Province, Iran. At the 2006 census, its population was 208, in 76 families.

Prominent Iranian novelist Jalal Al-e-Ahmad documented life and culture in Owrazan in his 1954 monograph 'Owrazan':

References 

Populated places in Taleqan County